Edin Selimović (born 28 January 1991) is a Serbian football midfielder.

References

External links
 
 Edin Selimović stats at utakmica.rs

1991 births
Living people
Serbian footballers
Serbian expatriate footballers
Sportspeople from Novi Pazar
Bosniaks of Serbia
Association football midfielders
FK Novi Pazar players
FK Berane players
FK Moravac Mrštane players
Montenegrin First League players
Serbian First League players
Serbian SuperLiga players
Serbian expatriate sportspeople in Montenegro
Serbian expatriate sportspeople in Turkey
Expatriate footballers in Montenegro
Expatriate footballers in Turkey